Kurt Bendlin (born 22 May 1943) is a retired West German decathlete. In 1967 he became the first German person to set a world decathlon record in 34 years; he was voted German Sportsman of the Year, received the Silbernes Lorbeerblatt, and was cast in bronze by Arno Breker. Next year he won a bronze medal at the 1968 Olympics.

Bendlin won national decathlon titles in 1965, 1967, 1971, and 1974. Besides sport, he worked as policeman and teacher of physical education. He also organized outdoor camps and training courses for managers, and in 1986 published a related book Fitness für Manager.

References

1943 births
West German decathletes
Olympic bronze medalists for West Germany
Athletes (track and field) at the 1968 Summer Olympics
Olympic athletes of West Germany
Living people

Medalists at the 1968 Summer Olympics
Olympic bronze medalists in athletics (track and field)